Marie Carolle Lise de Ste-Croix (born November 28, 1968) is a Canadian educator, researcher and former political figure in New Brunswick. She represented Dalhousie-Restigouche East in the Legislative Assembly of New Brunswick from 1995 to 1999 as a Liberal member.

Biography
She was born in Dalhousie, New Brunswick and graduated from Mount Allison University in 1990 with a Bachelor of Arts in Canadian Studies. She then received a Masters in Science from the University of Guelph. De Ste-Croix was a teacher and French instructor in Iqaluit. She was defeated when she ran for re-election in 1999. Since September 2006, she has worked as Director of Alumni and Development for Mount Allison University.

References 

 List of Women MLAs, New Brunswick Legislative Library pg.8(pdf)

1968 births
Living people
New Brunswick Liberal Association MLAs
People from Restigouche County, New Brunswick
Women MLAs in New Brunswick